The Seiko World Super Tennis, also known as the Tokyo Indoor, was a men's tennis tournament played on indoor carpet courts at the Tokyo Municipal Gym in Tokyo, Japan that was part of the 1979 Colgate-Palmolive Grand Prix. The tournament was held from 30 October through 4 November 1979. It was a tournament of the Grand Prix tennis circuit and  matches were the best of three sets. Reigning champions and first-seeded Björn Borg won the singles title.

Finals

Singles

 Björn Borg defeated  Jimmy Connors 6–2, 6–2
 It was Borg's 11th singles title of the year and the 50th of his career.

Doubles

 Marty Riessen /  Sherwood Stewart defeated  Mike Cahill /  Terry Moor 6–4, 7–6

References

External links
 ITF tournament edition details

Tokyo Indoor
Tokyo Indoor
Tokyo Indoor